Philolaos Tloupas, artist name Philolaos ; born 23 March 1923) was a Greek sculptor. He was known for his architecturally influenced sculpture, which he combined with a strongly natural and organic tendency.

Biography 
Philolaos studied at the Athens School of Fine Arts between 1944 and 1947, in the workshop of Michael Tombros and Athanase Apartis. After his military service between 1947 and 1950, he traveled to Paris, where he studied at the École nationale supérieure des Beaux-Arts, following lessons by Marcel Gimond.

References 

1923 births
2010 deaths
20th-century Greek sculptors